Julia Pirie (8 July 1918 – 2 September 2008) was a British spy working for MI5 from the 1950s through her retirement in the 1990s. She was initially recruited to and primarily involved in spying on the Communist Party of Great Britain. In 1978, as that organisation had lost power, she withdrew from it and focused on other roles.

Early years and MI5 recruitment
Born in Harbury on 8 July 1918, Pirie lost her father Allen Grant Pirie in 1923 to wounds he had sustained in the First World War. She resettled with her mother Elizabeth Marie Pirie in Calcutta, her mother's birthplace. She returned to her native country in 1939 to join the Auxiliary Territorial Service (ATS) where she worked as a driver in England and later in Europe.

She then worked for the Duchess of Atholl. The duchess was a fierce opponent of Soviet control in Europe. Pirie also joined the First Aid Nursing Yeomanry (FANY). During the war FANY had been a recruiting ground for the Special Operations Executive and MI5 also may have used them. In any case, Julia joined MI5 and infiltrated the Communist Party as a typist.

Inside the Communist Party
In Pirie's obituary in The Daily Telegraph, her obituarist writes that she was "a small, dumpy woman with the appearance of a confirmed and rather matronly spinster", whose "unassuming demeanour masked a sharp intellect and the powers of observation essential for the task of a secret agent." She worked her way into the inner circles of the party, eventually working directly under party secretary John Gollan. This put her in a position to pass information from Gollan's office to her MI5 handlers. The Telegraph speculates that she may have been the inside agent who provided crucial information for two important MI5 operations described in Peter Wright's book Spycatcher.

In 1978, Pirie retired from the Party. By this time it had been much weakened by Soviet invasions of Hungary in 1956 and Czechoslovakia in 1968. The Party paid her pension until her death.

Later assignments and retirement
Although she had left the Communist Party, Pirie did not retire from MI5, and her next assignment was against the Provisional IRA. She travelled to various European countries playing the role of a tourist but in fact collecting information about them. On one occasion, still playing a tourist,  she rented a flat in Barcelona, just below an IRA safe flat. When authorities became concerned about the wireless emissions of her equipment, they raided her flat. Although the authorities were satisfied, there was a risk of the IRA having noticed, and the operation was abandoned.

After retiring from active operations in the 1990s, she lectured to groups of MI5 trainees and to the police.

References

External links
 Stevenson is an executive of the British Communist Party.

1918 births
2008 deaths
English spies
Communist Party of Great Britain members
People from Warwickshire
MI5 personnel
First Aid Nursing Yeomanry people